Réka is a Hungarian female given name. It is of Hun descent, originally being Kreka, possibly derived from the Turkic Arikan. Over time it changed into Réka. Although it is very difficult to find an affectionate form, there are some which are commonly used, such as Rékuci, Réki, Rékus, and Ré. Its Finnish cognate is Riikka.

The first known bearer of this name was the main wife of the Hunnic king Attila

Name days
February 6
November 10

Famous bearers of this name
 Réka Szilvay, Finnish-Hungarian violinist
 Réka Albert, Hungarian-American professor of Physics and Biology
 Réka Nagy, Hungarian swimmer

Hungarian feminine given names